Huang Li (born 23 December 1988, Shanghai) is a Chinese female track cyclist who specialises in omnium.

Career results
2014
3rd Omnium, Adelaide Cycling Grand Prix
3rd Omnium, South Australian Track Classic
2015
2nd Omnium, Taiwan Hsin-Chu Track International Classic
2017
Asian Track Championships
1st  Scratch Race
2nd  Points Race
1st Omnium, ITS Melbourne - DISC Grand Prix 
1st  Omnium, National Track Championships
2nd Omnium, ITS Melbourne - Hisense Grand Prix

See also 
China at the 2012 Summer Olympics - Cycling
Cycling at the 2012 Summer Olympics – Women's Omnium

References 

1988 births
Living people
Chinese female cyclists
Chinese track cyclists
Sportspeople from Shanghai
Cyclists at the 2012 Summer Olympics
Olympic cyclists of China